The Skookum cast is a  plaster cast showing the imprint of what appears to be a large animal’s left forearm, hip, thigh and buttocks. It was discovered in a muddy wallow near Mount Adams in the southern part of Washington state in the year 2000 and is argued by some to have been made by a Bigfoot.

Description
The cast was taken on September 22, 2000, during a Bigfoot Field Researchers Organization (BFRO) expedition to the Skookum Meadows area of the Gifford Pinchot National Forest in Washington state, during filming of the Animal X television show.  Researchers filming for the show left fruit in a muddy wallow overnight and imprint was discovered the next morning.

Analysis
As seen during the Animal X episode, the Skookum cast was scanned onto a computer for further analysis and also studied in person by physical anthropologist Dr. Grover Krantz, wildlife biologist Dr. John Bindernagel, and others.  Dr. Krantz stated his belief that the cast was made by a Sasquatch while others remain skeptical.  Professor of the Department of Anthropology at Idaho State University, Dr. Jeffrey Meldrum, also studied the cast and found specific details in what he believed to be the foot area of the cast and found evidence of dermatoglyphics that he believes are related to primate feet.

Skepticism
The Committee for Skeptical Inquiry have put forward the suggestion that the initial identification was premature and created bias among subsequent team members. The casting was made by wildlife ecologist LeRoy Fish, tracker Richard Noll, and animal tracker Derek Randles. While working with this team to find evidence of bigfoot, Richard Noll saw the impression and suggested to his team that it was left by a bigfoot. These team members may have been influenced by the suggestion, motivating them to co-validate the original identification.

Conclusion
On March 3, 2001, Marc Hume wrote an article for the National Post of Canada in which he recognized the clear tracks of an elk and described: "imprints left that would match perfectly with an elk's legs." In his opinion, the cast was "if anything, a cast of the impression made by the hindquarters of an elk.  However, debate continues regarding what animal truly left the imprint.

See also 
 Evidence regarding Bigfoot

References

Further reading 
 
 
 
 
 
 
 
 

Bigfoot
2000 works
Gifford Pinchot National Forest